Madonnina may refer to:
 Madonnina, a painting by Roberto Ferruzzi;
 Madonnina, a statue on the top of Milan Cathedral, Italy; or, named after it:
 Derby della Madonnina, a football match between Inter Milan and A.C. Milan;
 "Oh mia bella Madonnina", a Milanese song.